Benatae is a Municipality located in the province of Jaén, Spain. According to the 2006 census (INE), the city has a population of 586 inhabitants.

References

External links 
 Official website (in Spanish)

Municipalities in the Province of Jaén (Spain)